This article provides information on the Reserve Grade, Second Grade or B Grade Grand Finals of Rugby League competitions held on the Central Coast of New South Wales, Australia. The Match Details sub-section details the individual point-scorers in a match, where known.

The current competition is conducted under the auspices of the Central Coast Division Rugby League, an affiliate of NSW Country Rugby League and the New South Wales Rugby League.

List

Note:
 No Reserve/Second Grade Competition was held in 2003, 2004 or 2005, At that time, five of the clubs fielded teams in the Jim Beam Cup or the Newcastle Rugby League. Their reserves team played in the Central Coast First Division competition, along with the top sides of the other clubs.
 The colour boxes reflected the club colours in the corresponding season. Woy Woy and The Entrance have changed colours during their history.
 Prior to Grand Finals becoming compulsory in 1956, a Grand Final was held only if the minor premier was beaten either in the semi-final of Final.

Match Details
1949
OURIMBAH 11 (William Hunter try; Owen Morris 4 goals) defeated THE ENTRANCE 2 (C Fitzsimmons goal) at Wyong on Sunday, September 18, 1949.

1950 (B Grade Final) 
THE ENTRANCE 5 (R. Powell try; W. Fitzsimmons goal) defeated GOSFORD 2 (Des Hattley goal) at Wyong on Sunday, August 20, 1950.

1951 (B Grade Final) 
WYONG 8 (R. Osborne, J. Clouten tries; Fred Eaton goal) defeated OURIMBAH 2 (O. Morris goal) on Sunday, August 12, 1951.

1952 (B Grade Final) 
WOY WOY 13 (R. Piconi, W. Ward, R. Donnelly tries; J. Connell 2 goals) defeated OURIMBAH 10 (J. Crisp, Brown tries; J. Frewin 2 goals) at Grahame Park on Sunday, August 17, 1952. Referee: Deaves.

1953 (B Grade) 
OURIMBAH 7 (R. Frewin try; K. Williams 2 goals) defeated WOY WOY nil at Grahame Park on Sunday, August 30, 1953.

1954 (B Grade Final) 
GOSFORD 31 (William Kirwin 3, Bev Smith 2, B. Hickey, K. Graham tries; C. Hore 5 goals) defeated WOY WOY nil at Grahame Park on Sunday, August 29, 1954.

1955 (B Grade Final) 
WOY WOY 21 (C. “Chic” Holden, Ron Derley, R. “Doc” McDermott, Jim King, Ray Cochrane tries; “Buller” Cross 3 goals) defeated THE ENTRANCE 7 (Brian Eggleton try; Brian Gee 2 goals) at Grahame Park.

1956
TORONTO 16 (B. McGrath 2, B. Wellings, K. Ewart tries; Alan Leahey, Sid Taylor goals) defeated ERINA nil at Grahame Park on Sunday, September 16, 1956. Referee: Hextall.

1957
GOSFORD 14 (Ron Hansen, B. Green tries; Lin Bailey 4 goals) defeated WOY WOY 9 (J. Coffey try and 3 goals) at Grahame Park on Sunday, September 1, 1957.

1958
GOSFORD 15 (R. Smith 2, A. Goldie tries; R. Haggerty 3 goals) defeated WOY WOY 12 (Brian Halderman, H. Hayward tries; J. Coffey 3 goals) at Grahame Park on Sunday, September 14, 1958.

1959
GOSFORD 10 (J. Cunnington, Lindsay Bailey tries; K. Hayward, Lindsay Bailey goals) defeated THE ENTRANCE 9 (K. Price try and 3 goals) at The Entrance on Sunday, September 20, 1959.

1960s
1960
ERINA 12 (A. Whelpton, M. Pickett tries; J. Walters 2, J. Davis goals) defeated WOY WOY 10 (R. McFarlane, H. Hayward tries; J. Coffey 2 goals) at Erina on Sunday, September 11, 1960.

1961 (B Grade) 
THE ENTRANCE 22 (Ray Parsons, J. Sewell, John Shore, C. Brown tries; Harold Evans, John Shore 4 goals) defeated ERINA 3 (Brian Graham try).

1963 (Reserve Grade) 
ERINA 7 (John Smith try; William Geldart 2 goals) defeated WOY WOY 5 (Dave Jones try; Merv McGahey goal).

1965
WOY WOY 15 (Max Wootton, R. Jones, Greg Quill tries; Eric Rowlands 3 goals) defeated OURIMBAH 6 (Lance Burkwood 2, K. Henry goals). Referee: N. Davidson.

1966
WOY WOY 11 (John Bourne 2, Eric Rowlands tries; Eric Rowlands goal) defeated OURIMBAH 7 (Robert Rushton try; William Hill 2 goals). Referee: Gordon Hattley.

1967
GOSFORD 26 (Keith Jack 3, William Mulheron 2, Robert Guest tries; Kevin Annand 2, William Kirwin 2, Peter Martin goals) defeated ERINA 9 (Richard Edwards try; Keith Walsh 3 goals). Referee: Alan Parsons.

1968 (Second Grade) 
WOY WOY 18 (Terry Dries, Geoff Pollett, Arthur Bartlett, Merv McGahey tries; Warren Taylor 2, Merv McGahey goals) defeated WYONG 2 (Noel Anderson goal).

1969
WYONG 23 (G. Sonter 2, P. Chapman, L. Tonks, J. Cox tries; L. Tonks 4 goals) defeated GOSFORD 6 (T. Crouch 2 goals and a field goal).

1970s
1970
GOSFORD 11 (William Nash try; Robert Whitton 3 goals; Dave Mills field goal) defeated WOY WOY 8 (Les Shaw, Lindsay Collins tries; Mick Allen goal).

1971
WYONG 6 (Len Tonks 3 goals) defeated ERINA 5 (Warrick Bissaker try and goal).

1972
WYONG 12 (William Scott, Mick Leaudais tries; Len Tonks 3 goals) defeated UMINA 5 (Peter Becker try; Paul Ryan goal).

1973
UMINA 24 (Mick Hicks 2, Frank Walpole 2, Terry Roberts, S. Cox tries, Mick Hicks 3 goals) defeated GOSFORD 8 (John Dodd 2 tries; Kim Plater goal).

1974
UMINA 18 (Ken Tillman 2, P. Quick, J Richards tries; Mick Hicks 3 goals) defeated WYONG 15 (B. Caulfield, P. Merrick, D. Woolbank) at Grahame Park.

1976 (Second Grade) 
GOSFORD 24 (Barry Weinert 3, Kim Plater tries; Roger Plater 6 goals) defeated WOY WOY 6 (Peter Becker 2 tries).

1977
WOY WOY 31 (Brad Murray 3, Gary Mason, Brad Cunnynghame, Noel Annand, Glen Compton tries; Noel Annand 5 goals) defeated WYONG 5 (Paul Healy 2 goals, field goal).

1978 (Second Grade) 
WYONG 12 (Geoff Greentree, Ian Bridge tries; Ross Lewis 3 goals) defeated WOY WOY 8 (Steve Heath, Paul Thomas tries; Harry Overton goal).

1979
WYONG 16 (Peter Haley, Geoff Greentree, Ray Waldron, Tony Keevell tries; Alan Cheal 2 goals) defeated WOY WOY 5 (Gary Fitch try; Terry Roberts goal).

1980s
1980
ERINA 14 (Rob Varday, Kevin Kirk tries; George Cooke 4 goals) defeated WYONG 7 (Dave Irwin try; P. Russell 2 goals) at Grahame Park on Sunday, September 14, 1980. Referee: Trevor Pickett.

1981
ERINA 15 defeated TOUKLEY 4 at Grahame Park on Sunday, September 13, 1981.

1982
ERINA 10 (Peter Wilson, Mick Ayton tries; George Pace 2 goals) defeated WOY WOY 2 (Richard Ford goal) at Grahame Park on Sunday, September 19, 1982. Referee: R. Sinclair.

1983
ERINA 18 (Greg Ramsay, Mathew Sharman tries; Paul Stanimeros 5 goals) defeated UMINA 2 (Darren Guest goal) at Grahame Park on Sunday, September 18, 1983. Referee: R. Saunders, Snr.

1984
WOY WOY 16 (Pat Dalton, Geoff Staunton tries; Steve Foody 4 goals) defeated WYONG 10 (Col Johnson try; Bob Shaw 3 goals) at Grahame Park on Sunday, September 16, 1984. Referee: Bill Curnoe.

1985
GOSFORD 14 (Anthony Clarke, Shane Upton tries; Brian Wishart 3 goals) defeated TERRIGAL 6 (Stuart Pike try; Carey Smith goal) at Grahame Park on Sunday, September 15, 1985. Referee: Robert Saunders.

1986
WYONG 21 (Simon Devlin 2, Ralph Poppi, Justin Brown tries; Greg Pearce 2 goals; Greg Pearce field goal) defeated WOY WOY 16 (Noel Annand, J. Mitchell, K. Fuller tries; S. Foody 2 goals) at Grahame Park on Sunday, September 10, 1989. Referee: J. Wells.

1987
WYONG 16 (unnamed tries; Greg Pearce, Brian Wishart goals) defeated GOSFORD 14 (Lenny Wright 2, Kevin Bloomfield tries; unnamed goals) in extra time at Grahame Park on Sunday, September 6, 1987. Referee: Kelvin Menchen.

1988
WYONG 18 (Steve Brown, Joe Narisia, Ritchie Montgomery tries; Ritchie Montgomery 3 goals) defeated WOY WOY 10 (Ken Forrester, Greg Brown tries; unnamed goal) at Grahame Park on Sunday, September 18, 1988.

1989
TERRIGAL-WAMBERAL 24 (Darren Dunn and others tries; Paul Ryan goals) defeated WOY WOY 22 at Grahame Park on Sunday, September 10, 1989. Referee: Kel Menchin.

1990s

1991 
THE ENTRANCE 16 (Michael Hart, Tony McCudden, Mark Hemming tries; Beecher 2 goals) defeated ERINA 13 (Michael Duke, Adrian Drew tries; Simon Watson 2 goals; Stephen Burns field goal) at Grahame Park on Sunday, September 1, 1991. Referee: Kel Menchin.

1992
THE ENTRANCE 24 (Stephen McSweeney, Dean Goodman, Glenn Ambrose tries; Jason Carpenter 6 goals) defeated ERINA 14 (Darren Neilsen, Peter Davis and one other tries; one goal) at Grahame Park on Sunday, September 13, 1992. Referee: W. Curnoe.

1993
ERINA 18 (Todd Petrie 2, Brett McKay, Craig Elton tries; unnamed goal) defeated WYONG 13 (Mark Vanderstock, Doug Baker, Darrell Squires tries; Ritchie Montgomery field goal) at Grahame Park on Sunday, September 5, 1993. Referee: R. Windle.

1994
WYONG 16 (Darren Adamo, Andrew Byles tries; Ritchie Montgomery 4 goals) defeated THE ENTRANCE 10 (Dave Piggins try; Tane Knebel 3 goals) at Grahame Park on Sunday, September 4, 1994.

1995
WOY WOY 16 (Warren Staunton, Adam Flakus tries; Troy Kent 4 goals) defeated WYONG 10 (Mark Ivers, Tim Dilandro tries; unnamed goal) at Grahame Park on Sunday, September 3, 1995.

1996
OURIMBAH 16 (Nick Walshaw, Max McGovern, Anthony Scarr tries; Michael Timp 2 goals) defeated WYONG 10 (Mark Vanderstok, Darren Leaudais tries; unnamed goal) at Grahame Park on Sunday, September 1, 1996.

1997
WYONG 16 (Scott Purcell, Daniel Lewis tries; Errol Mehmet 4 goals) defeated THE ENTRANCE 12 (Russell Groth, Graham Settree tries; unnamed goals) at Grahame Park on Sunday, September 7, 1997.

1998
ERINA 20 (Billy Felton, Dean English, Michael Erickson tries; Matt Whyte 4 goals) defeated WYONG 12 (Daniel Lawson, Stuart Lofts tries; Errol Mehmet 2 goals) at Grahame Park on Sunday, August 30, 1998. Referee: Ray Windle.

1999
WOY WOY 38 (Brett Rodgers 3, Peter Harrison, Nathan Johnson and others tries; unnamed goals) defeated WYONG 8 at Woy Woy Oval on Sunday, September 5, 1999.

2000s
2000
WOY WOY 15 (Tries; goals; Stephen Monie field goal) defeated WYONG 14 at NorthPower Stadium, Grahame Park on Saturday, August 26, 2000.

2001
WYONG 44 (Jason Cashin 2 and others tries) defeated THE ENTRANCE 4.

2002
WYONG 16 (Matt Lavin 2, Chris Garratley tries; Matt Lavin 2 goals) defeated THE ENTRANCE 14 at Central Coast Stadium, Grahame Park on Sunday, September 1, 2002.

2003 to 2005 no reserve grade or second grade competition.

2006
TERRIGAL 22 (Matthew Hunter, B. McMahon, Daniel McCarthy, S. Maginnity tries; P. Pearson 3 goals) defeated THE ENTRANCE 10 (A. Cotterill 2 tries, B. McCabe goal)

2007
THE ENTRANCE 22 defeated CENTRAL WYONG 14 at Woy Woy Oval on Sunday, September 23, 2007.

2008
NORTHERN LAKES 33 defeated THE ENTRANCE 32 at Bluetounge Stadium on Sunday, September 21, 2008.

2009
THE ENTRANCE 42 (Jake Treloar 3 and others tries) defeated NORTHERN LAKES 16 at Morrie Breen on Sunday, September 20, 2009.

2010s
2010
BERKELEY VALE 36 defeated ERINA 12.

2011
THE ENTRANCE 16 defeated ERINA 4 at Morrie Breen on Saturday, September 17, 2011.

2012
UMINA BEACH 22 (Dean Young, Terrence O’Sullivan, Ben Paget, Zane, Ririnui tries; Shane O’Sullivan 3 goals) defeated OURIMBAH-WYOMING 10 (Christopher Alipate, Corey Drew tries; John Buckley goal) at Morrie Breen on Saturday, September 15, 2012.

2013
WYONG 42 (Mitchell Nakhoul 2, Paneere Kaaka, Josiah Fonua, Joel Anderson, Brent Stevens tries; Paneere Kaaka 7 goals) defeated BERKELEY VALE 24 (Dennis Little, Jeremy Smith, Kyle Lear, Malcolm Perry, Shannon Allman tries; Dennis Little, Jeremy Smith goals) at Morrie Breen on Saturday, September 21, 2013.

2014
BERKELEY VALE 26 (Jake Callister 3 tries, Malcolm Parry, Vindon Spence tries; Mitchell Booth 2, Dennis Little goals) defeated WYONG 20 (Shaun Wright 2, Beau Richards, Shaan Anderson tries; Shaun Wright 2 goals) at Morrie Breen on Saturday, September 20, 2014.

2015
THE ENTRANCE 32 (Harley Waters 2, Ryan Doherty, Luke Kirkby, Jordan Huckstepp, Brodyn Mills tries; Ryan Doherty 4 goals) defeated WYONG 14 (Shaun Wright, Jake Fuller tries; Glenn Smith 3 goals) at Morrie Breen on Saturday, September 19, 2015.

2016
KINCUMBER 22 (Tim Giffin, Nathan Brown, Mitchell Clark, Joe Dawes tries; Blake Wylie 3 goals) defeated THE ENTRANCE 14 (Luke Kirkby 2, one other tries; one goal) at Woy Woy Oval on Saturday, September 17, 2016.

Sources

Digitised newspapers at the National Library of Australia's Trove website
  Gosford Times and Wyong District Advocate
  The Newcastle Herald
Microfilm of the following newspapers are available at the State Library of New South Wales and Central Coast Council libraries at Gosford and Wyong. The RAV numbers provided are those used by the State Library. 
  Gosford Times (RAV 24 - Reels #1, 1897-1900; #31 to #40, 1955 to 1962)
  Central Coast Express (RAV 61) 
  The Guardian (The Entrance and Wyong) (RAV 63 - Reels #1 and #2, 1933-1959 miscellaneous) 
  Wyong and Lakes District Advocate (RAV 178 - Reel #2, 1932-1956 miscellaneous)
 Erina Rugby League Football Club
 Woy Woy Roosters
 Fox Sports Pulse
 The following books are available at the Tuggerah Branch of the Central Coast Council Libraries

References

C
Australian rugby league lists
Rugby League
Grand finals